Bootmen is a 2000 Australian-American romantic comedy film directed by Dein Perry. It was distributed by Fox Searchlight Pictures and funded by the Australian Film Finance Corporation. Production was from 19 June to 18 August 1999 in Sydney and Newcastle by cinematographer Steve Mason who won two cinematography awards in the 2000 AFI awards and the 2001 FCCA Awards. It stars Adam Garcia, Sophie Lee and Sam Worthington.

The film was released in Australia on 5 October 2000 and was the debut film of Dein Perry, who was previously involved with stage shows such as Tap Dogs and Steel City. It is also known as Tap Dogs in Japan.

Plot
Sean and Mitchell are young adult brothers, having grown up in the rugged Australian steel city town of Newcastle. The father is a tough coal miner and they have no mother. Mitchell is a small-time criminal, while Sean dreams of being a professional dancer. Their father does not approve of Sean's dancing, so he hides his passion. Sean meets local hairdresser Linda at a dance class and falls in love with her. Things look promising between them, but Sean leaves to make his mark. Mitchell confesses his love for her and she thinks Sean has left, so they end up getting drunk together and having a one-night stand.

Meanwhile, Sean gets a role as a dancer in a show. The star's girlfriend flirts with him and the star gives Sean a difficult time, culminating with Sean outdancing him. They get into a shouting match. Sean punches the star and is fired.

Sean returns to Newcastle and tries to pick up where he left off with Linda, only to be told that she is pregnant with Mitchell's child. He breaks ties with both Linda and Mitchell, creates his own dance troupe and plans to show the people of Newcastle what they can do. Their father's work needs money to keep the company open and Sean plans a benefit show.

Mitchell gets in trouble with local thugs and escapes on his motorbike. They later catch him in a warehouse and he plunges to his death. The police immediately charge the culprit. Sean, depressed over the death of his brother and that he was unforgiving, thinks about quitting until he finds a tool that Mitchell designed, solving a technical problem with the show. Realizing that his brother believes in him, Sean is determined to honor his memory. The show goes on.

They charge $10 a head and estimate 5,000 patrons will attend the event, even Sean's proud Dad who now accepts his son as a dancer and tells Sean even his mother would be happy. Sean realises his dream of being a respected dancer, reconciles with Linda and pledges to help take care of his brother's child.

Cast
Adam Garcia as Sean Okden
Sophie Lee as Linda
Sam Worthington as Mitchell Okden
Richard Carter as Gary Okden
Andrew Kaluski as Colin
Christopher Horsey as Angus
Lee McDonald as Derrick
Matt Lee as Johnno
William Zappa as Walter
Susie Porter as Sara
Anthony Hayes
Justine Clarke
Grant Walmsley
Andrew Doyle
Bruce Venables
Tony Butterfield

Awards and nominations

Awards won
Australian Cinematographers Society (2001):
Award of Distinction (awarded to Feature Productions Cinema – Steve Mason)
Australian Film Institute (AFI) (2000):
Best Achievement in Cinematography: Steve Mason
Best Achievement in Costume Design: Tess Schofield
Best Achievement in Production Design: Murray Picknett
Best Achievement in Sound: David Lee, Laurence Maddy, Andrew Plain, Ian McLoughlin
Best Original Music Score: Cezary Skubiszewski
Film Critics Circle of Australia Awards (FCCA) (2001):
Best Cinematography: Steve Mason
Best Editing: Jane Moran
Best Music Score: Cezary Skubiszewski (tied with Edmund Choi for The Dish (2000)).

Award nominations
Australian Film Institute (AFI) (2000):
Best Achievement in Editing: Jane Moran
Best Film: Hilary Linstead
Best Performance by an Actor in a Leading Role: Sam Worthington

DVD release
The film was released on home video on 27 February 2001 by Fox Home Entertainment.

Soundtrack
The Bootmen Soundtrack was released by RCA Victor in 2000 and composed by Cezary Skubiszewski and other various artists.

 Rumble – You Am I
 Opening Sequence – Cezary Skubiszewski
 Strange Human Beings – Regurgitator
 Tease Me – Paul Kelly
 My Family – Banana Oil
 Sign Post – Grinspoon
 Love Theme – Cezary Skubiszewski
 Radio Loves This – Deborah Conway
 Hit Song – Custard
 Giveway – Supaskuba
 Better Off Dead – Grinspoon
 Don't It Get You Down – Deadstar
 Nothing on My Mind – Paul Kelly
 Nipple – Icecream Hands
 Deeper Water – Deadstar
 Finale Part 2 – Cezary Skubiszewski
 Shiver – Oblivia
 "Even When I'm Sleeping" – Leonardo's Bride
 Junk – You Am I
 Tap Forge – Dein Perry

Reception

Box office
Bootmen grossed $2,720,302 at the box office in Australia.

Critical reception
On review aggregator Rotten Tomatoes, the film holds an approval rating of 35% based on 17 reviews, and an average rating of 4.90/10. On Metacritic, the film has a weighted average score of 45 out of 100, based on 14 critics.

See also
 Cinema of Australia

References

External links

https://www.ozmovies.com.au/movie/bootmen Bootman] at Oz Movies

2000 films
Australian comedy-drama films
2000 comedy-drama films
Films set in New South Wales
Fox Searchlight Pictures films
2000 directorial debut films
2000s English-language films